Stephen C. Stearns (born December 12, 1946, in Kapaau, Hawaii and raised in Hawi, Hawaii) is an American biologist, and the Edward P. Bass Professor of Ecology and Evolutionary Biology Emeritus at Yale University. He is known for his work in life history theory and evolutionary medicine.

Education and training

 BA  Yale University 1967 
 MSc  University of Wisconsin, Madison 1971
 PhD  University of British Columbia 1975
 Miller Fellow University of California, Berkeley 1978

Investment in Infrastructure

 Helped to found the European Society for Evolutionary Biology (ESEB) in 1987. He later served on its council and as its president. 
 Founded the Journal of Evolutionary Biology, ESEB's main journal, served as its first managing editor from 1986 to 1991, and later served on its Editorial Board.
 With Tim Clutton-Brock, founded the Tropical Biology Association in 1991.
 Founded the online open-access journal Evolution, Medicine, and Public Health in 2013.

Awards and honors

 1987: Elected Fellow of the American Association for the Advancement of Science. 
 1993: European Chair of Biology at the École normale supérieure, Paris.
 2000: Clarion Award from the Association for Women in Communications for a book he wrote with his wife, Beverly Peterson Stearns, Watching, from the Edge of Extinction.
 2000: Distinguished Ecologist, University of Michigan.
 2004: Raymond Pearl Memorial Lecturer, Human Biology Association.
 2005: Fellow, Konrad Lorenz Institute.
 2005: Fellow, Rockefeller Bellagio Conference and Study Center.
 2005:  Honorary Member of the Swiss Zoological Society.
 2007:  Fellow, European Society for Evolutionary Biology.
 2011: DeVane Medal for distinction in undergraduate teaching, Yale University Phi Beta Kappa.
 2011–2012: Fellow, Wissenschaftskolleg zu Berlin
 2015: Honorary Doctorate, Faculty of Mathematics and Natural Sciences, University of Zurich.
 2021: Yale College Harwood F. Byrnes/Richard B. Sewall Teaching Prize

Positions

 1978–1983: Assistant Professor, Department of Biology, Reed College
 1983–2000: Professor of Zoology, University of Basel. 
 1986–1991: Managing Editor, Journal of Evolutionary Biology
 1991–1998: President, Tropical Biology Association.
 1994–1998: Chair, European Science Foundation Program in Population Biology.
 1995: Vice president of the Society for the Study of Evolution 
 1995–1996: Dean, Faculty of Science, University of Basel
 2002–2005: Chair, Department of Ecology and Evolutionary Biology, Yale University
 2000–present: Edward P. Bass Professor of Ecology and Evolutionary Biology, Yale University

Selected publications

Books
 The Evolution of Sex and its Consequences (Birkhaeuser 1987) 
 The Evolution of Life Histories (Oxford University Press 1992)  
 Evolution in Health and Disease (Oxford University Press 1999, 2nd Ed with Jacob Koella 2007) 
 Watching, from the Edge of Extinction (first author Beverly Peterson Stearns, Yale University Press 1999) 
 Evolution, an Introduction (with Rolf Hoekstra, Oxford University Press 2000, 2nd Ed 2005) 
 Evolutionary Medicine (with Ruslan Medzhitov, Sinauer 2016) 

Papers
.
.
.
.
.

References

External links
Stearns' web site at Yale University
Stearns' introductory course Principles of Evolution, Ecology and Behavior at Open Yale Courses
Evolution and Medicine (2015) with Stephen Stearns, YouTube
Evolution, Medicine, and Public Health at Oxford University Press

Living people
1946 births
21st-century American biologists
Yale University faculty
University of Wisconsin–Madison alumni
Yale University alumni
Evolutionary biologists
Fellows of the American Association for the Advancement of Science
Academic staff of the University of Basel